Shariful Islam (born 20 February 1995) is a Bangladeshi cricketer. He made his Twenty20 debut for Brothers Union in the 2018–19 Dhaka Premier Division Twenty20 Cricket League on 25 February 2019. He made his List A debut for Brothers Union in the 2018–19 Dhaka Premier Division Cricket League on 21 April 2019.

References

External links
 

1995 births
Living people
Bangladeshi cricketers
Brothers Union cricketers
People from Comilla